Haydn Davies (8 May 1905 – 18 April 1976) was a Welsh politician. He was Labour Member of Parliament (MP) for St Pancras South West from 1945 to 1950.

Early life 
He was the son of Mr. A. Davies, colliery examiner and he joined the London education service in 1926.

Political career 
He would get involved in politics and ran as the Liberal party candidate for St Pancras South West at the 1929 General Election, when he finished third. He then switched to the Labour party, running as their candidate for St Pancras South West and won the seat with a majority of 3,671 votes. The constituency was then abolished and merged into neighboring ones and instead he ran as the candidate for York in the 1950 Election. He lost, coming second and losing to Harry Hylton-Foster. He did not run for another constituency after that.

Political views 
Davies supported the BBC.

Death 

He died on 18 April 1976 in Warwick & Leamington, Warwickshire, England.

References

External links 
 

1905 births
1976 deaths
UK MPs 1945–1950
Labour Party (UK) MPs for English constituencies
Liberal Party (UK) parliamentary candidates